Robert W. Taylor may refer to:
 Robert William Taylor (1932–2017), computer scientist
 Robert W. Taylor (myrmecologist), Australian myrmecologist